Josée is a given name and can refer to:

Josée Auclair (born 1962), Canadian explorer
Josée Beaudin (born 1961), Canadian politician
Josée Chouinard (born 1969), Canadian figure skater
Josée Corbeil (born 1973), retired female volleyball player from Canada
Josée Dupuis, Canadian and American biostatistician
Josée France, former Canadian pairs figure skater
Josée Legault (born 1966), Canadian journalist
Josée Piché (born 1974), Canadian ice dancer
Josée Verner, PC, MP (born 1959), Canadian politician
Marie-Josée Croze (born 1970), Canadian actress
Marie-Josée Drouin (born 1949), economist (University of Ottawa) from Montreal, Quebec
Marie-Josée Frank (born 1952), Luxembourgian politician
Marie-Josée Gilbeau-Ouimet (born 1972), Canadian sprint canoeist
Marie-Josée Houle, accordionist who lives in Ottawa, Canada
Marie-Josée Jacobs (born 1950), politician from Luxembourg
Marie-Josée Roig (born 1938), French politician and the current mayor of Avignon
Marie-Josée Saint-Pierre (born 1978), documentary filmmaker and film animator

Fiction
 Josee, a character from The Ridonculous Race
 Josée, a 2021 Korean romantic drama film directed by Kim Jong-kwan
 "Josee, the Tiger, and the Fish", a 1984 Japanese short story
 Josee, the Tiger and the Fish (2003 film), a live-action film based on the short story
 Josee, the Tiger and the Fish (2020 film), an anime film based on the short story

See also
Josée and René de Chambrun Foundation, non-profit charitable foundation based in Paris, France